Longwood Covered Bridge is a historic Burr Arch Truss covered bridge located at Connersville, Fayette County, Indiana.  The bridge was built in 1884, and measures 97 feet long and 14 feet, 6 inches wide.  It is topped by a gable roof and sheathed in wood shingles, wood board siding, and board and batten siding at the gable ends. It was moved in 1984 to Roberts Park in Connersville and situated over dry land.

It was added to the National Register of Historic Places in 1981 and delisted in 1989.

References

Former National Register of Historic Places in Indiana
Truss bridges in the United States
Covered bridges in Indiana
Bridges completed in 1884
Transportation buildings and structures in Fayette County, Indiana
Relocated buildings and structures in Indiana
Wooden bridges in Indiana
Burr Truss bridges in the United States